Bokokius is a monotypic genus of  jumping spiders containing the single species, Bokokius penicillatus. It was first described by Carl Friedrich Roewer in 1942, and is only found on Bioko.

References

Monotypic Salticidae genera
Salticidae
Spiders of Africa
Taxa named by Carl Friedrich Roewer